McGrath Army Airbase is former United States Army airbase located in McGrath, a city in the Yukon-Koyukuk Census Area of the U.S. state of Alaska.

During its construction, equipment to construct the facility arrived too late in the season, as the ground had already frozen over. As a result, it was ordered that the equipment be brought to Umnak Island and Cold Bay, Alaska, which built Fort Glenn Army Airbase and Fort Randall Army Airfield, respectively. Both of those airfields later played a part in repelling the Japanese Attack on Dutch Harbor.

See also

 Alaska World War II Army Airfields
 Air Transport Command
 Northwest Staging Route
 List of airports in Alaska

References

 

Airfields of the United States Army Air Forces in Alaska
Closed installations of the United States Army
Military installations in Alaska